Narayankhed Vidhan Sabha constituency is one of 119 constituencies of Telangana Legislative Assembly, India and it is one of 10 constituencies in Sangareddy district, It is part of Zahirabad Lok Sabha constituency.

Mahareddy Bhupal Reddy  of Telangana Rashtra Samithi is representing the constituency for the first time.

Mandals
The Assembly Constituency presently comprises the following Mandals:

Election results

Telangana Legislative Assembly election, 2018 

.

Telangana Legislative Assembly by election, 2016 
The by election was necessitated following the death of Congress Member P. Kishta Reddy who won the seat in 2014. Bhupal Reddy won it with the biggest majority in the history of Naraynkhed constituency.

.

Telangana Legislative Assembly election, 2014

See also
 List of constituencies of Telangana Legislative Assembly

References

Assembly constituencies of Telangana
Medak district